Starman is an American science fiction television series starring Robert Hays and Christopher Daniel Barnes which continues the story from John Carpenter's 1984 film of the same name. The series aired on ABC from September 19, 1986 to May 2, 1987.

Storyline

The series takes place fifteen years after the film's story and features the return of the alien as a clone of deceased photojournalist Paul Forrester (Robert Hays) to meet and guide his now-teenage son Scott Hayden Jr. (Christopher Daniel Barnes) as they try to avoid a U.S. government agent and find the missing Jenny Hayden, Scott's mother.

Each episode of the series has the fugitive father and son moving from place to place meeting people that are in need of some assistance, while Scott tries to explain to his alien father what it means to be a human being as Starman is forced to deal with fallout from Forrester's rather hedonistic past. Each has a small silvery sphere of alien material, about 3–4 cm in diameter, that allows a trained mind to project thoughts to carry out telekinesis or telepathy in some limited manner. Starman is adept, but Scott is learning how to focus; in one episode, "Blue Lights", Scott inadvertently creates a picturesque image of a rotating ring of blue lights that is mistaken for a UFO. Both are also able to empathically connect with animals.

Starman and Scott are constantly trying to stay one step ahead of government UFO investigator George Fox (Michael Cavanaugh), who regards both father and son as a threat to humanity and will not tolerate them running free in society. In one episode, when Starman tells Fox that children are the world's hope for the future, Fox reacts with hostility to imply that Scott is some sort of mutant and therefore not acceptable. Starman, however, holds no malice toward Fox, and even treats a life-threatening condition Fox has before he and Scott make their escape.

In a two-part episode, "Starscape", Starman and Scott find Jenny Hayden (Erin Gray) living as an artist, under the name Karen Iseley, in Arizona. One more episode, "The Test", aired after the two-part episode, trying to pave the way for a second season, but the series was canceled.

Cast
Robert Hays as Paul Forrester / Star Man 
Christopher Daniel Barnes as Scott Hayden Jr.
Michael Cavanaugh as George Fox
Patrick Culliton as FSA Agent Wylie

Critical reception
Starman scored a critics' rating of 34 out of 100 on Metacritic, based on 5 "generally unfavorable" reviews. These ranged from The Miami Herald calling it "warm and funny" to the Los Angeles Times stating, "Brother, is this a drag".

Episodes

Awards and nominations
Starman was nominated twice in 1987 for the Young Artist Award. The series received a nomination for Best Family Television Drama, and its co-star Christopher Daniel Barnes received a nomination for Best Young Actor Starring in a Television Drama Series.

DVD release
The entire series was released on DVD in April 2012.

References

External links
 
 

1980s American science fiction television series
1986 American television series debuts
1987 American television series endings
American Broadcasting Company original programming
Live action television shows based on films
Television series about alien visitations
Television series by Sony Pictures Television